Reunion is a 1989 album by vibraphonist Gary Burton, reuniting him with his former guitarist Pat Metheny for the first time in 13 years. Burton met Metheny at the Wichita Jazz Festival in 1973 (when Metheny was 18 years old), later welcoming him as a teaching colleague at the Berklee College of Music. He hired Metheny for the newly expanded Gary Burton Quintet in 1974. Burton and Metheny feature alongside keyboardist Mitchel Forman, bass guitarist  Will Lee and drummer Peter Erskine.

Metheny left Burton's group in 1977 to form his own quartet with Lyle Mays. The two had virtually no contact with each other until, in early 1988, the organizers of the Montreal Jazz Festival contacted Burton. They told him that Metheny was the festival host and invited Burton to join him onstage. "My apprehension was immediately erased when I saw how easy it was for us to play together, even after 12 years," said Burton. This led to their collaboration on Reunion.

Track listing

Personnel
 Gary Burton – vibraphone, marimba
 Pat Metheny – guitar
 Mitchel Forman – piano, keyboards
 Will Lee – bass guitar
 Peter Erskine – drums, percussion

Technical
 Gary Burton – producer
 Dan Gellert – assistant engineer
 Dave Grusin and Larry Rosen – executive producers
 Recorded and mixed by Rob Eaton

Chart performance

Album – Billboard

References

External links and sources
 [Allmusic Reunion at Allmusic]
 Liner notes by Neil Tesser

1989 albums
Gary Burton albums
GRP Records albums